Kiril Georgiev can refer to:

 Kiril Georgiev (born 1965), Bulgarian chess grandmaster
 Kiril Georgiev (cyclist), Bulgarian cyclist
 Kiril Georgiev (weightlifter), Bulgarian weightlifter